The Chinese blackbird (Turdus mandarinus) is a member of the thrush family Turdidae.  It was formerly considered a subspecies of the related common blackbird (T. merula).

Subspecies

The Chinese blackbird (T. m. mandarinus) breeds throughout much of southern, central and eastern China. It is a partial migrant to Hong Kong and south to Laos and Vietnam. The male is sooty black, and the female is similar but browner, and paler on the underparts. It is a large subspecies.
Sowerby's blackbird (T. m. sowerbyi), named for James Sowerby, British naturalist and illustrator, breeds from eastern Sichuan to Guizhou. It is partially migratory, with some individuals spending the winter in southern China and northern Indochina. It resembles mandarinus, but is smaller and darker below.

References

Chinese blackbird
Birds of China
Chinese blackbird
Chinese blackbird